Amir Salari (also Romanized as Amīr Sālārī; also known as Amīr Sālār) is a village in Rahgan Rural District, Khafr District, Jahrom County, Fars Province, Iran. At the 2006 census, its population was 227, in 45 families.

References 

Populated places in  Jahrom County